The 2015–16 Bucknell Bison men's basketball team represented Bucknell University during the 2015–16 NCAA Division I men's basketball season. The Bison, led by first year head coach Nathan Davis, played their home games at Sojka Pavilion, and were members of the Patriot League. They finished the season 17–14, 14–4 in Patriot League play to win the regular season league championship. They lost in the quarterfinals of the Patriot League tournament to Holy Cross. As a regular season champion who failed to win their league tournament, they received an automatic bid to the National Invitation Tournament where they lost in the first round to Monmouth.

Previous season
The Bison finished the 2014–15 season 19–15, 13–5 in Patriot League play to win the Patriot League regular season championship. They advanced to the semifinals of the Patriot League tournament where they lost to Lafayette. As a regular season league champion who failed to win their league tournament, they received an automatic bid to the National Invitation Tournament where they lost in the first round to Temple.

On March 30, head coach Dave Paulson resigned to take the same position at George Mason. He finished at Bucknell with a 10-year record of 134–94. On April 20, the school hired Nathan Davis as head coach.

Departures

Incoming recruits

2016 class recruits

Roster

Schedule

|-
!colspan=9 style="background:#; color:white;"| Non-conference regular season

|-
!colspan=9 style="background:#; color:white;"| Patriot League regular season

|-
!colspan=9 style="background:#; color:white;"| Patriot League tournament

|-
!colspan=9 style="background:#; color:white;"| NIT

References

Bucknell Bison men's basketball seasons
Bucknell
Bucknell
Bucknell
Bucknell